Joseph Randall Crawford (born May 2, 1970) is a former Major League Baseball pitcher who played for the New York Mets in 1997. Notably, Crawford made his major league debut as a pinch hitter in the top of the 15th inning in a game against the Los Angeles Dodgers before stepping on the mound in the bottom of the frame.

He formerly worked as a coaching assistant for the Milwaukee Brewers. Now he serves as a high school Vice Principal and Athletic Director for the Willard Flashes in Ohio.

References

1970 births
Living people
Major League Baseball pitchers
New York Mets players
Milwaukee Brewers coaches
Baseball players from Florida
Chiba Lotte Marines players
American expatriate baseball players in Japan
Bridgeport Bluefish players
Binghamton Mets players
Columbia Mets players
El Paso Diablos players
Indianapolis Indians players
Kingsport Mets players
Norfolk Tides players
Saraperos de Saltillo players
St. Lucie Mets players
Tucson Sidewinders players
American expatriate baseball players in Mexico